David Alan Stevenson FRSE, F.I.C.E., FRSGS (7 February 1891 – 22 December 1971) was a lighthouse engineer from the famous Stevenson lighthouse-builder family and noted amateur philatelist.

In 1951, Stevenson was awarded the Crawford Medal by the Royal Philatelic Society London for his work The Triangular Stamps of Cape of Good Hope.

Life

He was born at 9 Manor Place on 7 February 1891 the son of Margaret Sherriff and Charles Alexander Stevenson. He was the last of a long line of lighthouse engineers. He was named after his uncle, David Alan Stevenson but was generally called Alan. The family lived at 9 Manor Place in Edinburgh's West End. He was educated at Edinburgh Academy 1899 to 1903, then studied civil engineering at the University of Edinburgh graduating with a BSc in 1912.

In 1911 he was living with his family at 28 Douglas Crescent.

In World War I he served as a Captain in the Royal Marines as an engineer. His duties included setting guidance lights on the Dardanelles to aid shipping there.

In 1919 he was elected a Fellow of the Royal Society of Edinburgh. His proposers were Charles Alexander Stevenson (his father), David Alan Stevenson (his uncle), William A. P. Tait, James Simpson Pirie, Sir Thomas Hudson Beare and Harry Rainy.

Until 1938 he was an engineer of the Northern Lighthouse Board and thereafter spent his life working for the Clyde Lighthouse Trust.

He died on 22 December 1971 and was buried in the first northern extension to Dean Cemetery in western Edinburgh. The grave lies immediately alongside his parents.

Family

He was married to Jessie MacLaggan (1897–1973).

Family tree

Alan's position in the family tree shows his long pedigree as an engineer.

Selected publications

The Triangular Stamps of Cape of Good Hope (New York, London, Sydney: H.R. Harmer, 1950)
The World's Lighthouses before 1820 (1959)

References

External links

1891 births
British philatelists
Philately of South Africa
Fellows of the Royal Philatelic Society London
Scottish architects
1971 deaths
Alumni of the University of Edinburgh
Lighthouse builders
Stevenson family (Scotland)